The 1881 Dartmouth football team represented Dartmouth College in the 1881 college football season. Dartmouth compiled a record of 1–0–1.

Schedule

References

Dartmouth
Dartmouth Big Green football seasons
College football undefeated seasons
Dartmouth football